Phanaeus adonis is a species of dung beetle in the family Scarabaeidae.

References

Further reading

 

adonis
Articles created by Qbugbot
Beetles described in 1863